"Brothers in Arms" is a ballad by British rock band Dire Straits, the closing track on their fifth studio album of the same name, released on 18 October 1985. It was written in 1982, the year of Britain's involvement in the Falklands War. The Falklands militia was held under arrest, by the Argentinian army - and the population of the Falklands was less than 2000. In the song, there is an opening riff of a thunder-storm i.e. rain. There is also mention of mountains and lowlands, as well as farming.

In 2007, the 25th anniversary of the war, Mark Knopfler recorded a new version of the song at Abbey Road Studios to raise funds for British veterans who he said "are still suffering from the effects of that conflict." "Brothers in Arms" has become a favourite at military funerals.

Background
This song was written during the Falklands War and is described by some as an anti-war song.

History
There are two studio recorded versions of this song: the album version which is 6:55 minutes, and the shorter version which is 6:05 minutes and features slightly different (and shorter) solos at the beginning and end of the song. The version that appears on Dire Straits' greatest hits album, Sultans of Swing: The Very Best of Dire Straits, is 4:55. The version included on the live album On the Night contains an extra pedal steel guitar solo and is 8:55. The full-length, studio album version (6:55) was also included on the 2005 compilation Private Investigations.

Mark Knopfler recorded and usually played the song on a Gibson Les Paul Standard guitar, rather than his usual Fender "Stratocaster", and the sunburst Les Paul appears in the distinctive promo video, which is in the style of a charcoal drawing, interspersing scenes of the band playing with scenes of war. During Dire Straits' 1992 "On Every Street" tour, Knopfler used his Pensa-Suhr MK1 for this song, like most of the others.

"Brothers in Arms" was first released as a single on 14 October 1985. The song is reported to be the first CD single ever released; it was released in the United Kingdom in 1986.

The song's lyrics, influence, and impact were discussed from a variety of musical and personal perspectives in the BBC radio programme and podcast Soul Music first broadcast in September 2012.

Reception
Classic Rock critic Paul Rees rated "Brothers in Arms" to be Dire Straits' 5th greatest song, citing its "dignified but lasting power" and a "stunning guitar solo."

Music video

The music video, directed and animated by Bill Mather, produced by Simon Fields through Limelight Films and cinematographed by Francis Kenny, uses rotoscoping and shows the band performing, overlaid with images of the First World War. In contrast with the at-that-time very modern clip in "Money for Nothing", the video clip has a very classic appearance in noisy black and white images.

"Brothers in Arms" won Grammy Award for Best Music Video at the 29th Annual Grammy Awards on 24 February 1987.

Use as soundtrack for films and TV series

The song appeared in the second-season episode "Out Where the Buses Don't Run" of Miami Vice, the third-season episode "I Coulda Been a Defendant" of Due South, and the second season finale of The West Wing, "Two Cathedrals". In each instance, it is used over the climactic scenes of the episode. It was also featured in the 1991 film McBain, the 2001 movie Spy Game and in the series finale, "START", of The Americans as well as the episode "Say Again Your Last" in SEAL Team. It was used as the title music to the 1992 BBC drama series Civvies. The song also appeared in the series finale of Supernatural.

Track listings
7" single (DSTR 11)

 "Brothers in Arms" - 6:04
 "Going Home (Theme of the Local Hero)" (Live) - 4:45

12" Maxi-Single (DSTR 1112)

 "Brothers in Arms" (Full Length Version) - 6:58
 "Going Home (Theme of the Local Hero)" (Live) - 4:45
 "Why Worry" (Instrumental Segment)

Charts

Certifications

See also
List of anti-war songs

References

1985 singles
1985 songs
1980s ballads
Animated music videos
Anti-war songs
Charity singles
Dire Straits songs
Grammy Award for Best Short Form Music Video
Rock ballads
Songs about soldiers
Songs about the military
Songs written by Mark Knopfler
Vertigo Records singles